The 2021–22 Colorado State Rams men's basketball team represented Colorado State University for the 2021–22 NCAA Division I men's basketball season. The team was coached by Niko Medved, who was in his fourth season as head coach. The Rams played their home games at Moby Arena on CSU's main campus in Fort Collins, Colorado as members of the Mountain West Conference. They finished the season 25–6, 14–4 in Mountain West Play to finish in second place. As the No. 2 seed, they defeated Utah State in the quarterfinals of the Mountain West tournament before losing in the semifinals to San Diego State. They received an at-large bid to the NCAA tournament as the No. 6 seed in the South Region, where they were upset in the first round by Michigan.

Previous season

In a season limited due to the ongoing COVID-19 pandemic, the Rams finished the 2020–21 season 20–8, 14–4 in Mountain West Conference play to finish in third place. They defeated Fresno State in the first round of the Mountain West tournament before losing to Utah State in the semifinals. They received an at-large bid to the National Invitation Tournament where they defeated Buffalo and NC State to advance to the semifinals where they lost to Memphis. In the third place game, they lost to Louisiana Tech.

Offseason

Departures

Incoming transfers

2021 recruiting class

Roster

Schedule and results

|-
!colspan=9 style=| Exhibition

|-
!colspan=9 style=| Non-conference regular season

|-
!colspan=9 style=| Mountain West regular season

|-
!colspan=9 style=| Mountain West tournament

|-
!colspan=9 style=| NCAA tournament

Source

Conference matchups
Colorado State finished the 2021–22 Mountain West Conference regular season with a 14–4 record, placing second in the conference's regular season standings behind Boise State.

In the 2022 Mountain West Conference men's basketball tournament, the Rams received a first-round bye as the tournament's second seed.

Notable games

Regular season
November 9, 2021, at Moby Arena vs. Oral Roberts: In the first game with fans at Moby Arena in over a year (due to the COVID-19 pandemic), Colorado State beat Oral Roberts — a team that made the Sweet Sixteen the previous year — 109–80. John Tonje led the Rams in scoring, setting a new career-high with 31 points.
December 4, 2021, at Moby Arena vs. Saint Mary's: Undefeated 8–0 Colorado State hosted 8–1 Saint Mary's on December 4, 2021, at Moby Arena. Colorado State led 35–24 at halftime and held on to a double-digit lead for the entirety of the second half, winning 74–58. David Roddy led the scoring with 19 points.
December 11, 2021, at Dickies Arena vs. Mississippi State: 9–0 Colorado State took on 6–2 Mississippi State on December 11, 2021, at neutral Dickies Arena in Fort Worth, Texas for the Basketball Hall of Fame Classic game. Mississippi State led 29–27 at halftime but Colorado State came back to outscore the Bulldogs in the second half and win the game 66–63. David Roddy led the scoring for the Rams, recording 19 points on a 72% field goal percentage. Colorado State was voted into the AP Top 25 following this game, entering the rankings at number 23.
January 8, 2022, at Viejas Arena vs. San Diego State: 9–3 (1–0 conf) San Diego State hosted AP No. 20 11–0 (1–0 conf) Colorado State at Viejas Arena in San Diego on January 8, 2022. San Diego State led 36–32 at halftime before dominating the second half, outscoring Colorado State 43–17. The Aztecs won the game 79–49, giving the previously undefeated Rams their first loss of the season in embarrassing fashion. Matt Bradley led the Aztecs in scoring with 26 points, while Isaiah Stevens and David Roddy led the Rams with 19 and 17 points respectively.
January 28, 2022, at Moby Arena vs. UNLV: 16–1 (6–1 conf) Colorado State hosted 11–9 (3–4 conf) UNLV at Moby Arena on January 28, 2022. After winning five Mountain West Conference games in a row following their loss to San Diego State, the Rams were upset by UNLV 88–74. Bryce Hamilton led UNLV in scoring, recording a new career-high of 42 points. Despite the loss, Isaiah Stevens also set a new career-high with 35 points, nearly matching the 39 points scored by the rest of the Rams combined.
January 31, 2022, at Arena-Auditorium vs. Wyoming: Three days after being upset by UNLV, 16–2 (6–2 conf) Colorado State traveled north to Laramie, Wyoming to take on 16–3 (5–1 conf) Wyoming in the first of two annual Border War rivalry games. Regulation ended with the Rams and Cowboys tied at 70, and the Cowboys outscored the Rams 14–8 in overtime to hand the Rams their first back-to-back loss of the season. David Roddy led the Rams in scoring with 23 points before fouling out in overtime. Roddy made 9 of 15 shots — including 4 of 5 three-pointers — but struggled at the free-throw line, missing 2 of 3 shots including one that would've won the game at the end of regulation. Hunter Maldonado led the scoring for the Cowboys by recording a new career-high 35 points, which marked the second consecutive game where the Rams allowed an opposing player to set a new career-high. Graham Ike recorded 16 points and 8 rebounds for the Cowboys before fouling out in overtime along with Roddy.

February 4, 2022, at Moby Arena vs. San Diego State: 16–3 (6–3 conf) Colorado State hosted 12–5 (4–2 conf) San Diego State in a rematch of the January 8 matchup that the Aztecs won by 30. Moby Arena sold out and "oranged out" for the game as Colorado State held its annual Aggie throwback game. The Rams led 23–18 after a low-scoring first half. Colorado State opened the second half strongly and led by as many as 20 points with 10 minutes left in the game, but San Diego State made a comeback in the last few minutes of the game as a result of multiple Colorado State turnovers and fouls. The Aztecs took their first lead of the entire game with 14 seconds left in the game before a David Roddy jumper and a James Moors defensive block ended the game 58–57 in favor of the Rams. Colorado State students stormed the court in celebration after the Rams won. Three players — Roddy (22), John Tonje (16), and James Moors (10) — scored all but 10 points for the Rams. Matt Bradley led the Aztecs with 27 points.
February 11, 2022, at Moby Arena vs. Fresno State: Moby Arena sold out for the third consecutive game when 18–3 (8–3 conf) Colorado State hosted 16–7 (6–4 conf) Fresno State on February 11, 2022. Colorado State and Fresno State were third and fifth in Mountain West Conference basketball standings at the time, respectively. Fresno State led Colorado State at halftime 28–25, but the Rams bounced back to outscore the Bulldogs 40–22 in the second half to win 65–50. David Roddy led the Rams in points (21), assists (8), and rebounds (7). Isaiah Stevens (14), James Moors (11), and John Tonje (10) also scored in the double figures for Colorado State. Orlando Robinson led the Bulldogs with 24 points.
February 13, 2022, at ExtraMile Arena vs. Boise State: Two days after beating Fresno State in Fort Collins, 19–3 (9–3 conf) Colorado State traveled to Boise, Idaho to take on 19–5 (10–1 conf) Boise State. Prior to the game, Boise State was tied with Wyoming for first place in the Mountain West at 10–1, while Colorado State was third at 9–3. Colorado State got off to a strong start, reaching a double-digit lead midway through the first half before Boise State came back to shrink it to a two-point CSU lead at halftime. Regulation ended tied at 67 after a back-and-forth second half. In overtime, Max Rice scored six of Boise State's seven points while Chandler Jones scored six of Colorado State's 10 points, and the Rams won the game 77–74. David Roddy led the Rams with 18 points, while Chandler Jacobs (16) and Isaiah Stevens (14) also scored in the double figures. Boise State was led by Max Rice and Marcus Shaver Jr., who both recorded 17 points, as well as Tyson Degenhart with 16 points.
February 19, 2022, at Thomas & Mack Center vs. UNLV: 21–3 (11–3 conf) Colorado State traveled to Las Vegas on February 19, 2022, seeking revenge against 15–11 (7–6 conf) UNLV for their upset victory in Fort Collins a few weeks prior. However, the Rams struggled throughout the entire game, scoring just 24 points in the first half and 51 points in total on a 34.6 field goal percentage. UNLV led by 11 at halftime and won the game 72–51 to sweep the Rams in their regular season series — the only team to beat Colorado State more than once in the 2021–22 season. Isaiah Stevens led the Rams with 14 points, while Bryce Hamilton led the Rebels with 20 points.
February 23, 2022, at Moby Arena vs. Wyoming: 21–4 (11–4 conf) Colorado State hosted 22–4 (11–2 conf) Wyoming on February 23, 2022, in front of another sold-out crowd at Moby Arena for the second annual game of the Border War rivalry. While the score remained close throughout most of the game, Colorado State held a lead for the majority of the game, leading 31–27 at halftime and winning the game 61–55. David Roddy led the Rams with 26 points, while Chandler Jacobs recorded 18 points off the bench. Drake Jeffries led scoring for the Cowboys with 22 points.
March 5, 2022, at Moby Arena vs. Boise State: For Colorado State's senior night and final regular season game, the 23–4 (13–4 conf) Rams hosted 24–6 (15–2 conf) Boise State, the 2021–22 Mountain West Conference regular season champions. Moby Arena sold out for the fifth consecutive game and all three CSU seniors — Kendle Moore, Chandler Jacobs, and Adam Thistlewood — were in the Ram's starting lineup. Colorado State led 41–36 at halftime and went on to win the game 71–68, sweeping the season series against the Broncos. David Roddy led the Rams with 23 points while Kendle Moore scored 19 points on his senior night. Abu Kigab led the Broncos with 15 points.

Paradise Jam tournament

Quarterfinals: November 19, 2021, at Sports and Fitness Center vs. Bradley: In the first game of the 2021 Paradise Jam Tournament, Colorado State beat Bradley 66–60. The Rams were down 27–21 at halftime but bounced back to score 45 points in the second half to win the game. The Rams were led by David Roddy, who recorded a new career-high of 30 points.
Semifinals: November 21, 2021, at Sports and Fitness Center vs. Creighton: In the semifinals game of the 2021 Paradise Jam Tournament, Colorado State beat previously undefeated Creighton 96–81. Two days after David Roddy set a new career-high in scoring against Bradley, he sunk seven of ten three-pointers on his way to setting a new career-high of 36 points. The Rams as a whole made 20 three-pointers, a new school record.
Final: November 22, 2021, at Sports and Fitness Center vs. Northeastern: After trailing Northeastern by 20 points early in the second half of the tournament's championship game, the Rams put together a comeback and outscored the Huskies 47–17 in the final 17 minutes to win the game — and the 2021 Paradise Jam Tournament — 71–61. David Roddy, who scored 27 points — and averaged 31 points a game — was named the MVP of the tournament.

Mountain West tournament

Quarterfinals: March 10, 2022, at Thomas & Mack Center vs. TBD:

References

Colorado State Rams men's basketball seasons
Colorado State
Colorado State Rams
Colorado State Rams
Colorado State